HHZ may refer to:
 Hectohertz (hHz)
 Hikueru Airport, in French Polynesia
 Port HHZ, a Royal Navy shore establishment in Scotland during the Second World War
 Headhunterz, a Dutch Hardstyle DJ